Toub is a surname. Notable people with the surname include:

Dave Toub (born 1962), American football player and coach
Shaun Toub (born 1963), Iranian-born American actor